Stumpa Dúloigh (Irish for "stump of the black lake") also known as Maol, is the highest of the Dunkerron Mountains, part of the Mountains of the Iveragh Peninsula in County Kerry, Ireland.

Name
The mountain is named after a small lake called Loch an Dúloigh or Lough Duff. The mountain's alternative name Maol means "bare flat-topped hill". It is reflected in placenames on its slopes: Coimín na Maoile, Loch na Maoile (Lough Namweela), and An Mhaol Ghlas (Moyleglass).

Geography 
The mountain lies northwest of Knockaunanattin (569 m). West of Stumpa Dúloigh the Dunkerron range splits in two parts: the NE one leads to Broaghnabinnia (745 m) while the SE sub-range reaches Knocknabreeda (569 m). With an elevation of 784 metres it is the 55th highest summit in Ireland.

Access to the summit 
Stumpa Dúloigh's summit can be accessed from the end of the Black Valley; it is a 6 hours' walk (there and back) suitable only for experienced hikers.

References

External links
 Stumpa Dúloigh at MountainViews

Mountains and hills of County Kerry
Mountains under 1000 metres
Marilyns of Ireland
Hewitts of Ireland